Cymothoe angulifascia is a butterfly in the family Nymphalidae. It is found in the Democratic Republic of the Congo (Uele, Tshopo, Maniema, Mai-Ndombe, Kwilu, Kasai, Sankuru and Lualaba).

References

Butterflies described in 1897
Cymothoe (butterfly)
Endemic fauna of the Democratic Republic of the Congo
Butterflies of Africa
Taxa named by Per Olof Christopher Aurivillius